Reciprocity may refer to:

Law and trade
 Reciprocity (Canadian politics), free trade with the United States of America
 Reciprocal trade agreement, entered into in order to reduce (or eliminate) tariffs, quotas and other trade restrictions on items traded between the signatories
 Interstate reciprocity, recognition of sibling federated states' laws: 
 In the United States specifically: 
 Full Faith and Credit Clause, which provides for it
 Occupational licensing, which in some jurisdictions provides for it
 Traffic violations reciprocity where non-resident drivers are treated like residents
 Quid pro quo, a legal concept of the exchange of good or services, each having value

Social sciences and humanities
 Norm of reciprocity, social norm of in-kind responses to the behavior of others
 Reciprocity (cultural anthropology), way of defining people's informal exchange of goods and labour
 Reciprocity (evolution), mechanisms for the evolution of cooperation
 Reciprocity (international relations), principle that favours, benefits, or penalties that are granted by one state to the citizens or legal entities of another, should be returned in kind
 Reciprocity (social and political philosophy), concept of reciprocity as in-kind positive or negative responses for the actions of others
 Reciprocity (social psychology), in-kind positively or negatively connoted responses of individuals towards the actions of others
 Ethic of reciprocity (the Golden Rule), that one should treat others as one would like others to treat oneself
 Serial reciprocity, in which the benefactor of a gift or service will in turn provide benefits to a third party

Physical sciences and engineering
 Reciprocity (engineering), used in the analysis of structures and to resolve complex load conditions
 Reciprocity (electromagnetism), theorems relating sources and the resulting fields in classical electromagnetism
 Reciprocity (electrical networks), reciprocity theorem as it relates to current and voltage in electrical networks
 Reciprocity (network science), measures the tendency of vertex pairs to form mutual connections between each other
 Reciprocity (optoelectronic),  a diode under illumination to the photon emission of the same diode under applied voltage
 Reciprocity (photography), the relationship between the intensity of the light and duration of the exposure that result in identical exposure
 Reciprocity of twist and wrench, in screw theory
 Reciprocity theorem (disambiguation), several unrelated results
 Reciprocity of antenna transmitting and receiving characteristics
 Helmholtz reciprocity, linear propagation.

Mathematics
 Reciprocity law (law of reciprocity) in mathematics, including
 Quadratic reciprocity, a fundamental result in number theory
 Cubic reciprocity, theorems that state conditions under which the congruence  is solvable
 Quartic reciprocity, a collection of theorems in elementary and algebraic number theory that state conditions under which the congruence  is solvable
 Artin reciprocity law, a general theorem in number theory that provided a partial solution to Hilbert's ninth problem
 Reciprocity relation or exact differential, a mathematical differential of the form dQ, for some differentiable function Q
 Weil reciprocity law
 Reciprocal polynomials, the coefficients of the remainder polynomial are the bits of the CRC
 Reciprocal square root
 Reciprocity (projective geometry), a collineation from a projective space onto its dual space, taking points to hyperplanes (and vice versa) and preserving incidence
 Frobenius reciprocity, from group representation theory
 Reciprocity law for Dedekind sums
 Stanley's reciprocity theorem, states that a certain functional equation is satisfied by the generating function of any rational cone and the generating function of the cone's interior
 Hermite reciprocity for invariants of binary forms.

Other
 Reciprocity (Fringe), a 2011 episode of the television series Fringe
 Rural Municipality of Reciprocity No. 32, Saskatchewan, Canada

See also
 Reciprocal (disambiguation)
 Reciprocation (disambiguation)
 Reciprocity Treaty (disambiguation)
 Reciprocal altruism between individuals of different species
 Meeting of the minds in contract law, sometimes called reciprocity
 Tit for tat